Charles Philippe de Bosset (29 July 1773 - 15 March 1845) was a Swiss engineer, who as an officer of the British army, became governor of Cephalonia. The de Bosset Bridge in Cephalonia is named after him.

Life 
Born in Neuenberg, Switzerland, de Bosset was a member of the so-called Swiss Regiment and rose to the rank of colonel. From 1810 to 1813, he was governor of the island of Cephalonia, and oversaw numerous infrastructure developments, including the expansion of the road network and the construction of today's De Bosset Bridge over the Gulf of Argostoli. To increase financial leeway, he introduced taxes, e.g. on street lighting, and had illegal annexes on the main Lithostroto road demolished. In recognition of his services, de Bosset was made a Knight of the Order of Guelph in 1816. From 1816 to 1818 he served as Inspector of the Ionian Islands. On his retirement, he was presented by citizens with a gold medal inscribed in Greek and Italian. 

After his return to Switzerland, he frequently visited in England and made the work of the optician Pierre-Louis Guinand known there. In 1827 de Bosset founded a glove factory in Fleurier.

Archaeological work and collections 
de Bosset carried out various excavations on Cephalonia and Ithaca. He bequeathed his archaeological and numismatic collection to the British Museum in London and to the city of Neuchâtel, where more than 40 Mycenaean vases are housed in the Musée cantonal d'archéologie.

References

External links
 Chaeles de Bosset, Wikipedia in German

1773 births
1845 deaths
History of Cephalonia
Swiss numismatists
Swiss archaeologists
British Army officers